Mohamed Khamis (born 13 January 1976) is an Emirati swimmer. He competed in three events at the 1992 Summer Olympics.

References

1976 births
Living people
Emirati male swimmers
Olympic swimmers of the United Arab Emirates
Swimmers at the 1992 Summer Olympics
Place of birth missing (living people)